Paulo d'Eça Leal (15 July 1901 – 18 September 1977) was a Portuguese fencer. He won a bronze medal in the team épée competition at the 1928 Summer Olympics.

References

External links
 

1901 births
1977 deaths
Portuguese male épée fencers
Olympic fencers of Portugal
Fencers at the 1924 Summer Olympics
Fencers at the 1928 Summer Olympics
Fencers at the 1936 Summer Olympics
Olympic bronze medalists for Portugal
Olympic medalists in fencing
Medalists at the 1928 Summer Olympics
Sportspeople from Lisbon
20th-century Portuguese people